Tapura neglecta is a species of plant in the Dichapetalaceae family. It is endemic to Gabon.

References

neglecta
Vulnerable plants
Endemic flora of Gabon
Taxonomy articles created by Polbot